The 2002 WAFL season was the 118th season of the West Australian Football League. It saw East Perth, despite the end of the first host club scheme that was thought to have unfairly favoured the Royals, win their third successive premiership for the first hat-trick in the WA(N)FL since Swan Districts between 1982 and 1984. The Swans themselves had a disastrous season as chronic financial troubles, which had plagued the club for almost a decade were combined with disastrous results on the field. The black and whites were within two points of a winless season in the seniors and did little better in the lower grades.

Cinderella club Peel Thunder, despite going within two minutes of the first goalless score in senior WAFL football for over eighty-six years and being voted out of the competition by seven of the other eight clubs at a meeting to extend their licence on 6 May, achieved their best overall record to date and their first tangible honours as diminutive on-baller Allistair Pickett won the Sandover Medal. The Thunder, remarkably, provided in Daniel Wells the joint runner-up in the Medal as well as the winner. The loss of these players, and of financial support given to prevent Peel from folding, was to see the Thunder after three years of relatively promising on-field form including wins against three finalists in 2002 again hit rock-bottom the following season. The league’s most famous club, East Fremantle, aided by two lower grade premierships from 2001, rebounded from their disastrous senior record that season to make the finals aided by the only ruck division able to rival the Royals, but this was to be their last finals appearance for the decade as the Sharks reached depths not experienced at any point during the twentieth century over the subsequent four seasons, winning a mere nineteen of eighty matches.

Even apart from Peel’s near-goalless score, 2002 was notable for low scoring, with the high score of 22.13 (145) the lowest in the WAFL since 1927, and the average of 80.83 points the lowest since 1954, in an era when Perth received rainfall much greater than under present-day greenhouse gas concentrations.

Home-and-away season

Round 1 (Easter weekend)

Round 2

Round 3

Round 4

Round 5 (Anzac Day)

Round 6

Round 7

Round 8

Round 9

Round 10 (Foundation Day)

Round 11

Round 12

Round 13

Round 14

Round 15

Round 16

Round 17

Round 18

Round 19

Round 20

Round 21

Ladder

Finals

First semi-final

Second semi-final

Preliminary final

Grand Final

References

External links
Official WAFL website
West Australian Football League (WAFL), 2002

West Australian Football League seasons
WAFL